Brorsen may refer to:

Søren Brorsen (1875–1961), Danish politician 
Theodor Brorsen (1819 – 1895), Danish astronomer
23P/Brorsen-Metcalf, a periodic comet discovered by him
3979 Brorsen, a main-belt asteroid named for him
5D/Brorsen (also Comet Brorsen), a comet discovered by him